The Arberia Parish is an Eastern Orthodox Christian parish subordinated to the Russian Orthodox Church (Patriarchate of Moscow). It serves the minority Orthodox Christian community of the Arberesh people of Italy, who are predominantly adherents of the Italo-Albanian Greek Catholic Church. Its head church is in Acquaformosa near Cosenza and is headed by Father Giovanni Capparelli, who is a subordinate of the Patriarch of Moscow. The patron saints of the Arberesh Orthodox Church are Saint John of Kronstadt and Saint Catherine Megalomartyr.

References

Sources

External links

Eastern Orthodox Christians from Albania
Arbëreshë people
Eastern Orthodoxy in Italy